The  was a pair of semi-dreadnought battleships built for the Imperial Japanese Navy (IJN) in the first decade of the 20th century. They were the first battleships to be built in Japan and marked a transitional stage between the pre-dreadnought and true dreadnought designs. They saw no combat during World War I, although  led a squadron that occupied several German colonies in the Pacific Ocean in 1914. Both ships were disarmed and expended as targets in 1922–1924 in accordance with the terms of the Washington Naval Treaty of 1922.

Background

The Satsuma class was ordered in late 1904 under the 1904 War Naval Supplementary Program during the Russo-Japanese War. Unlike the previous  pre-dreadnought battleships, they were the first battleships ordered from Japanese shipyards, although the first ship in the class, Satsuma, used many imported components.

They were originally intended to mount a dozen  gun in four twin and four single-gun turrets, but the combination of a shortage of Japanese-built 12-inch guns and their additional expense caused the ships to be redesigned to carry four 12-inch and twelve  guns, all in twin-gun turrets. The intended armament of these ships, laid down before , would have made them the first "all big-gun" battleships in the world had they been completed to their original design.

Probably reflecting extensive British technical assistance, the Satsuma-class ships greatly resembled an enlarged version of the British  with the single-gun amidships intermediate turrets replaced by twin-gun turrets. With their heavy intermediate armament, the ships were considered to be semi-dreadnoughts, a transitional stage between pre-dreadnoughts with their light intermediate armament and dreadnoughts solely equipped with large guns.

Description
The IJN took the opportunity provided by the delay to modify the ship to accommodate steam turbines and various other changes that generally increased her size. The changes were great enough that Aki is generally considered a half sister to Satsuma. The crew ranged from 800 to 940 officers and enlisted men.

She displaced  at normal load. She displaced  at normal load.

Propulsion
Satsuma was powered by a pair of vertical triple-expansion steam engines, each driving one propeller shaft, using steam generated by 20 Miyabara water-tube boilers using a mixture of coal and fuel oil. Unlike her half-sister, she only had two funnels.

Aki was intended use the same type of engines as her sister, but the IJN decided fit her with a pair of Curtiss steam turbine sets after she was launched in 1907. The turbines each powered one propeller shaft using steam from 15 Miyabara boilers.

Armament
The ships were completed with four 45-caliber 12-inch 41st Year Type guns in two gun turrets, one each fore and aft of the superstructure. The intermediate armament was much more numerous than in the preceding Katori class, with six twin-gun turrets equipped with 45-caliber Type 41 10-inch guns, three turrets on each side of the superstructure. The guns had a muzzle velocity of  when firing  shells.

The other major difference between the two ships was that Akis secondary armament consisted of eight 45-caliber 6-inch (152 mm) 41st Year Type guns, mounted in casemates in the sides of the hull. Satsuma, in contrast, was equipped with a dozen quick-firing (QF) 40-caliber 4.7-inch (120 mm) 41st Year Type guns, mounted in casemates in the sides of the hull.

The ships were also equipped with four (Satsuma) or eight (Aki) 40-caliber QF 12-pounder 12-cwt guns and four 28-caliber QF 12-pounder guns. In addition, the battleships were fitted with five submerged  torpedo tubes, two on each broadside and one in the stern.

Armor
The waterline main belt of the Satsuma-class vessels consisted of Krupp cemented armor that had a maximum thickness of  amidships and tapered to a thickness of  inches at the ends of the ship. A  strake of armor protected the casemates. The armor of Satsumas main gun turrets had a maximum thickness of  inches and those of Aki were an inch thicker.

Ships

Service
The completion of the British battleship Dreadnought with her all big-gun-armament and steam turbines in 1906 meant that these ships were obsolete even before they were completed. The IJN recognized that fact when it drew up the first iteration of its Eight-Eight Fleet building plan for eight first-class battleships and eight battlecruisers in 1910 and did not include them.

Aki was refitting at Kure and Satsuma was assigned to the 1st Battleship Squadron when World War I began in August 1914. The latter served as Rear Admiral Tatsuo Matsumura's flagship in the Second South Seas Squadron as it seized the German possessions of the Caroline and the Palau Islands in October 1914. Satsuma rejoined the 1st Battleship Squadron in 1915, was refitted at Sasebo Naval Arsenal in 1916 and served with the 1st Squadron for the rest of the war. Aki was also assigned to the 1st Squadron upon the completion of her refit and remained with it until she was transferred to the 2nd Battleship Squadron in 1918.

In the years immediately following the end of the war, the United States, Britain, and Japan all launched huge naval construction programs. All three countries decided that a new naval arms race would be ill-advised, and so convened the Washington Naval Conference to discuss arms limitations, which produced the Washington Naval Treaty, signed in February 1922. Japan was well over the tonnage limits and all of her obsolete predreadnought and semi-dreadnought battleships had to be disposed of by the end of 1924. Both ships were disarmed at Yokosuka in 1922, stricken from the Navy List during 1923 and converted into target ships. Aki was sunk by the battlecruiser  and the battleship  in Tokyo Bay on 2 September 1924; Satsuma was sunk by the battleships  and  five days later in the same area.

Notes

Footnotes

References

External links

 Materials of the Imperial Japanese Navy

Battleship classes